Tides Live is the fifth live album, the ninth album overall and the last instalment of the Tides series by California-based worship collective Bethel Music. The album was released on February 25, 2014 by the group's imprint label, Bethel Music.

Background
Following the successful release of Tides in September 2013, Bethel Music began leading the songs from that album during the weekend services at Bethel Church in Redding and at regional gatherings and recording them. Joel Taylor, director of Bethel Music, in a statement on Hear It First, said:
The new live album offers a fresh and powerful perspective on these songs, and draws listeners into a worship experience full of spontaneous moments and sounds of praise.

 – Joel Taylor, Hear It First

Critical reception

At AllMusic, David Jeffries rated the album three stars out of five, concluding that "fans of the original Tides will appreciate this set, which certainly sounds bigger, although not necessarily better." Rating the album four and a half stars by Louder Than The Music, Jono Davies thinks that "This album is not better or worse than its studio brother, this album is different and equally as strong," and concludes that "All of this together creates a brilliant time of live worship captured wonderfully in this album."

Track listing

Charts

Release history

References

2014 live albums
Bethel Music albums